Beware! The Blob (also known as Beware the Blob, Son of Blob, The Blob II or The Blob Returns) is a 1972 American independent science fiction comedy horror film directed by Larry Hagman. It is a sequel to The Blob (1958). The screenplay was penned by Anthony Harris and Jack Woods III, based on a story by Jack H. Harris and Richard Clair. The film originally earned a PG rating from the MPAA, though it is now unrated. It is the second film in The Blob film series.

Plot 
Picking up fifteen years after the events of the first movie, The Blob, an oil pipeline engineer named Chester (Godfrey Cambridge) returns to his suburban Los Angeles home from the North Pole, bringing with him a small sample of a mysterious frozen substance uncovered by a bulldozer on a job site, a story which he tells his wife. Not aware that the substance is a piece of the Blob from the original 1958 incident in Pennsylvania, Chester comes home to store the substance in his home freezer prior to taking in to the laboratory to be analyzed.  However, he and his wife Marianne (Marlene Clark) accidentally let it thaw, re-animating the Blob. It starts by eating a fly, then a kitten, then Marianne, and then, while Chester is consumed while watching a television broadcast of the film The Blob, it eats him, too.

Lisa (Gwynne Gilford), a friend, walks in to see Chester in the final stages of being consumed by the Blob. She escapes, but cannot get anyone to believe her, not even her boyfriend Bobby (Robert Walker Jr.). Meanwhile, the rapidly growing creature quietly preys upon the town. Some of its victims include a police officer (Sid Haig) and two hippies (Cindy Williams and Randy Stonehill) in a storm drain, a barber (Shelley Berman) and his client, transients (played by director Hagman, Burgess Meredith and Del Close), a Scoutmaster (Dick Van Patten), a farm full of chickens and horses, and (off-camera), people in a gas station, a bar, as well as various townspeople who turn up "missing."  At one point, Lisa and Bobby find themselves trapped in Bobby's truck with the creature attempting to find a way inside. While panicking, the truck's air conditioning is accidentally switched on and the Blob retreats because of its vulnerability to cold.

The now-massive Blob consumes a hippie in a dune buggy, who inadvertently crashes in to it while it was crossing the road, followed by his girlfriend who tried to save him, and then invades a neighboring bowling alley during a championship tournament.  After consuming dozens more people, the Blob moves on to an attached skating rink under renovation. It is finally stopped when Bobby activates the rink's ice mechanism, freezing it. While the frozen Blob is being filmed by a television crew, one of the crew's bright lights is positioned on the ground, melting a small portion of it, which oozes toward the sheriff and envelops his feet as he is speaking on camera to a nationwide television audience.

Cast

Production 

Larry Hagman previously directed episodes of I Dream of Jeannie and The Good Life and went on to do the same for several episodes of Dallas and In the Heat of the Night (the only series for which he directed, but never acted). This would be his only feature film as a director. To cast the film, Hagman recruited friends from the motion picture industry, (some of whom were literally his neighbors in Malibu, California, including Burgess Meredith and Carol Lynley) who were asked if they would like to be "blobbed". Gwynne Gilford was cast as the lead via the traditional auditioning process, while Robert Walker Jr. was an early hire by Jack H. Harris.

Budgeted at slightly more than the 1958 version at $150,000, filming began in the spring of 1971, primarily on the property of a horse stable and ranch home in Diamond Bar, California, as well as in Pomona, California, both 30 miles east of Los Angeles. The climactic finale at the bowling alley and ice skating rink was filmed at two separate locations.  The former Grand Central Bowl in Glendale, California, stood in for the bowling alley (the building still stands as part of the Disney Imagineering complex, and was also filmed as Jack Rabbit Slims in Pulp Fiction), while the ice skating rink scenes were filmed at the former Rollerdrome in Culver City, California (immediately prior to the building being torn down in August, 1971 to make way for Tellefson Park). The party scene was filmed in a loft in Venice, California. In an interview in Fangoria magazine, screenwriter and first time producer Anthony Harris stated that a good portion of the filmed material was improvised on the set, and that his script was ignored. While in production, Harris was also in the process of preparing a second sequel, Curse of the Blob, but these plans were never implemented.

Contrary to the original 1958 film, in which the Blob was largely portrayed by gallons of silicone dyed red, which needed to be repeatedly stirred to maintain the consistent red color, the Blob in Beware! the Blob was mostly created from a red-dyed powder blended with water to form the desired consistency. The Blob was alternately created from other materials as well, including a large red plastic balloon, semi-transparent red plastic sheeting illuminated with a backlight, and a large rotating red drum of hard red silicone placed in front of the camera lens.

Renowned cinematographer Dean Cundey, who would later go on to be a cinematographer on such films as Halloween, The Thing, the Back to the Future series and Jurassic Park, worked on Beware! The Blob alongside two other special effects technicians responsible for creating the Blob effects, supervisor Tim Baar and Conrad Rothmann. Cundey was also the camera operator on second unit shots of the Blob eating the fly, the kitten, etc.

Beware! The Blob was intended as a December 1971 release, but was held back until June 1972 to capitalize on the lucrative summer movie and drive-in theater audience. An exceptional film marketer, Harris later paired the movie with other films to which he held the rights (notably Equinox), and renamed the film Son of Blob in some markets as a test title. The film premiered on television in 1974.

Home media
As Son of Blob together with The Blob, the film was released on DVD by Umbrella Entertainment in September 2011. The DVD is compatible with all region codes.  Beware! The Blob was transferred to HD in its correct 1.85 ratio and released on Blu-ray by Kino Lorber on September 20, 2016.

Reception 

Film historians Kim R. Holston and Tom Winchester considered the film was "... Now viewed as a relic of mid- to late-hippiedom ... overall, there's some tension, and some nods to the predecessor."

See also
 List of British films of 1972

References

Bibliography

 Holston, Kim R. and Tom Winchester. Science Fiction, Fantasy and Horror Film Sequels, Series and Remakes: An Illustrated Filmography. Jefferson, North Carolina: McFarland & Company, 1997. .

External links
 
 
 
 

The Blob (film series)
1972 films
1972 horror films
1970s comedy horror films
1970s science fiction horror films
American comedy horror films
American science fiction comedy films
American monster movies
American science fiction horror films
American sequel films
1970s English-language films
Fictional amorphous creatures
Films directed by Larry Hagman
Films set in Los Angeles
1970s monster movies
Parodies of horror
1972 directorial debut films
1972 comedy films
1970s American films